Garra magnidiscus is a species of cyprinid fish in the genus Garra. Identified in 2013, Garra m. is found in the Upper Siang district of Arunachal Pradesh where is it is known locally as Ngop. The name magnidiscus (in Latin: large disc) refers to a distinctive large adhesive disc found in the posterior region of its mouth.

References

Further reading
Arunachalam, M., S. Nandagopal and R.L. Mayden, 2013. Morphological diagnoses of Garra (Cypriniformes: Cyprinidae) from North-Eastern India with four new species description from Brahmaputra" River. J. Fish. Aqua. 4(3):121-138. (Ref. 95162)
Tamang, Lakpa. "Garra magnidiscus, a new species of cyprinid fish (Teleostei: Cypriniformes) from Arunachal Pradesh, northeastern India." Ichthyological Exploration of Freshwaters 24.1 (2013): 31–40.

Garra
Taxa named by Lakpa Tamang
Fish described in 2013